Kozcağız is a town (belde) and municipality in the Bartın District, Bartın Province, Turkey. Its population is 7,248 (2021). It is on the west bank of Kocanaz creek.

References

Populated places in Bartın Province
Towns in Turkey
Bartın District